David Ossipovitch Widhopff (Russian - Давид Осипович Видгоф) (5 May 1867, Odessa - 20 July 1933, Saint-Clair-sur-Epte) was a Ukrainian and French painter, caricaturist and poster artist.

Life
He gained his diploma at Odessa's royal academy before moving to Munich, where he joined the royal academy and became a student of Max Herterich, and then in August 1887 to Paris. There he entered the Académie Julian, where he studied under Tony Robert-Fleury and Jules Joseph Lefebvre. During his years (1887-1890) at the Académie Julian, his colleagues included Maurice Denis and Paul Ranson. During his time in France, Widhopff keenly followed the styles of William-Adolphe Bouguereau for a while.

He exhibited at the Paris Salons of 1888, 1891 and 1893. He travelled to Brazil and set up a fine-arts school in the state of Pará. On his return to Paris, he visited Montmartre and became friends with Alfons Mucha and Léon Deschamps, editor of La Plume. He also met Hugues Delorme and Jules Roques at Le Courrier français, giving rise to a fruitful collaboration with (among others) Willette to provide illustrations for it.

At the turn of the century, Widhopff was in the service of the Vollard gallery, the gallery belonging to Ambroise Vollard, one of the most important dealers in French contemporary art in the twentieth century. Vollard had hired him to make posters. He also created tapestries for the Beauvais factory during this time. His association with these two places resumed in the 1920s.

During his lifetime, Widhopff earned acclaim for his diverse methods of expression. His uniqueness was his ability to work equally well with both pencil as well as the brush. His drawings are known for their lively expressions, colorful imagery and rich humor.

Selected paintings

References

External links

More works by Widhopff @ ArtNet

1867 births
1933 deaths
19th-century French painters
French male painters
20th-century French painters
20th-century French male artists
Ukrainian male painters
French caricaturists
Ukrainian caricaturists
French illustrators
Ukrainian illustrators
Ukrainian emigrants to France
French poster artists
Ukrainian poster artists
Artists from Odesa
Académie Julian alumni
Emigrants from the Russian Empire to France
19th-century male artists
19th-century French male artists